Empires is the second studio album by American death metal band Animosity,  released in 2005.

Track listing

Personnel
Animosity
Dan Kenny - Bass
Frank Costa - Guitars
Chase Fraser - Guitars
Navene Koperweis - Drums
Leo Miller - Vocals

Production
Paul A. Romano - Art direction, Artwork, Design,
Amy Trachtenberg - Photography (Band)
Zack Ohren - Recording, Mixing, Mastering

References

2005 albums
Animosity (band) albums